In molecular biology, the DpnII restriction endonuclease family is a family of restriction endonucleases which includes DpnII from Diplococcus pneumoniae. These enzymes recognise the double-stranded DNA unmethylated sequence GATC and cleave before G-1, where it encompasses the full length of the protein.

References

Protein families